Kidz may refer to:
 "Kidz" (song), a song by Take That
 KIDZ-LD, a low-power television station in Abilene, Texas, U.S.
 Kidz Magazine, a 1995-2007 magazine
 "Kidz", a song by Plan B from Who Needs Actions When You Got Words
 A defunct TV station in Wichita Falls, Texas

See also
 Kid (disambiguation)